Blue Sox Stadium was a ballpark located in Abilene, Texas and was the home to the Abilene Blue Sox of the West Texas–New Mexico League (1946–1955) and the Big State League (1956–1957). The park was located on the northeast corner of Barrow and South 14th streets; at the present time, the site is home to the H-E-B grocery store.

The stadium opened in April 1946 to host the Blue Sox and was suitable for night play from its opening date.

Closure and demolition
Repairs were made to the stadium prior to the 1956 season, with new box seats being added along with a new infield.

However, the site of the stadium was purchased and petitioned for re-zoning for the end of the 1957 baseball season. The stadium was razed in September 1957 and replaced with a shopping center.

Sources
 "Texas Almanac 2008–2009", The Dallas Morning News, c.2008

References

Baseball in Abilene, Texas
Sports venues in Abilene, Texas
Demolished sports venues in Texas
Sports venues demolished in 1957
1957 disestablishments in Texas
1946 establishments in Texas
Sports venues completed in 1946